Kingsley Agbodike (born 15 January 1999), also known as Kingsley Ogbodike, is a Nigerian footballer who currently plays as a forward for KS Kastrioti.

Career statistics

Club

Notes

References

1999 births
Living people
Nigerian footballers
Nigerian expatriate footballers
Association football forwards
Kategoria e Parë players
Kategoria Superiore players
FK Tomori Berat players
KS Kastrioti players
Nigerian expatriate sportspeople in Albania
Expatriate footballers in Albania
Sportspeople from Lagos